Stephen Brenner (born 1974 in Waterford, Ireland) is an Irish sportsperson.  He plays hurling as a goalkeeper with his local club De La Salle and was a member of the Waterford senior inter-county team from the 1990s until the 2000s.

References

1974 births
Living people
Hurling goalkeepers
De La Salle hurlers
Waterford inter-county hurlers